Periya may refer to:
 Periya, Kasaragod, Kerala, India
 Periya, Wayanad, Kerala, also called Boys Town

See also